Azariah S. Partridge (December 19, 1834April 28, 1901) was a Michigan politician.

Early life 
Partridge was born on December 19, 1834 in Saratoga County, New York. Around 1856, Partridge moved to Flushing Township, Michigan. Partridge worked as a teacher for several years.

Political career 
Partridge was a farmer and a fruit grower. In 1874, Partridge served as drain commissioner for Flushing Township. On January 5, 1881, Partridge was elected as a member of the Michigan House of Representatives from the Genesee County 1st district as a Republican. He held this seat until 1882. In 1886, Partridge ran unsuccessfully as a Prohibitionist candidate for the position of  United States Representative from Michigan's 6th District. Partridge became a member of the Michigan Prohibition Party State Central Committee in 1887. Partridge ran unsuccessfully as a Prohibitionist candidate in the 1890 Michigan gubernatorial election. Henry I. Allen, of Schoolcraft, Michigan, ran as the Prohibitionist candidate for lieutenant governor alongside Partridge. In 1894, Partridge ran unsuccessful once again for the position of  United States Representative from Michigan's 6th District as a Populist candidate. Around 1898, Partridge moved to Mount Clemens, Michigan.

Personal life 
Partridge had a stroke on the Partridge married Lura Penoyer on February 7, 1862. She was the first white woman to be born in the Flushing area. Together they had four children. Lura died on May 11, 1892. Partridge was a Freemason. Partridge was Baptist.

Death 
Partridge had a stroke of paralysis on April 23, 1901. On April 27, he had another stroke. On April 28, Partridge died in his home in Mount Clemens. He is interred at Flushing City Cemetery.

References

1834 births
1901 deaths
American Freemasons
Baptists from Michigan
Farmers from Michigan
People from Saratoga County, New York
People from Genesee County, Michigan
Republican Party members of the Michigan House of Representatives
Michigan Prohibitionists
Michigan Populists
Burials in Michigan
19th-century American politicians